A climbing train is a team of road bicycle racers climbers whose goal is to protect their team leader in the climbing stages.  Typically a climbing train attempts to set a climbing pace that favors its team leader, and discourage or neutralize attacks by riders from other teams.

See also
Sprint train

Road bicycle racing terminology